Unadilla may refer to:

Places in the United States 
Settled places:
 Unadilla, Georgia, city in Dooly County
 Unadilla, Nebraska, village in Otoe County
 In Otsego County, New York:
 Unadilla, New York, town
 Unadilla (village), New York, in the eponymous town
 Unadilla Forks, New York, a hamlet
 Unadilla Township, Michigan, in Livingston County
Other geographical features:
 Unadilla River, in New York state
 Unadilla, California, former settlement in Kern County

Other uses 
 Unadilla (moth), a genus of snout moths in subfamily Phycitinae

See also